Héctor Marcelo Buquet Corleto (born October 4, 1963 in Montevideo, Uruguay) is a Uruguayan actor and former model.

Biography
At the age of 18 Buquet joined a theater company in his native Uruguay called El Galpón del Uruguay where he participated in 25 stage productions as an actor, producer, songwriter and singer. At the age of 26 he moved to Mexico and participated in the telenovela Simplemente María with Victoria Ruffo and in Manolo Fábregas' production of Bear Jest for which he was nominated as the Best Comedy Actor of the Year by the Association of Theater Journalists of Mexico. In 1992 he obtained a role in his second telenovela: El abuelo y yo with Gael García Bernal. The following year he obtained a role in Uruguay's full feature film El dirigible. In 1994 he produced and starred in Triángulo directed by Miguel Córcega in Mexico City and Montevideo, Uruguay and in Che... Che... Chejov which received the Best Self-Taught Production of the Year. In 1998 he played as Rodrigo Bracho in La usurpadora and its special short sequel Más allá de la usurpadora. His most recent work has been in his fourth Colombian telenovela: Doña Bella in 2010.

Awards
 1998 Special mention by the Association of Theater Critics of Uruguay
 1994 Best Self-Taught Production of the Year by the Mexican Association of Theater Critics
 1991 Foreign-born Model of the Year by Contempo Agency

Telenovelas

Personal
Buquet was married to Lorena Sotelo, who died in 2013 at age 39 from liver cancer. The couple had a son, Marcel, born in 2009.

External links

 Photo gallery

Uruguayan male stage actors
Uruguayan male telenovela actors
Mexican theatre managers and producers
Uruguayan emigrants to Mexico
1963 births
Living people
Uruguayan male film actors
Uruguayan people of French descent